Don Winslow (born October 31, 1953) is an American retired author best known for his award-winning and internationally bestselling crime novels, including Savages, The Force and the Cartel Trilogy.

Early life 
Winslow was born on October 31, 1953, in New York City. He grew up in Perryville, a beach town near the village of Matunuck, Rhode Island. He credits his parents for preparing him to become a writer: his mother was a librarian and his father was a non-commissioned officer in the United States Navy who told stories and invited Navy friends around who told more. They inspired Winslow to become a storyteller himself. He majored in African history at the University of Nebraska. While in college, he traveled to southern Africa, sparking a lifelong involvement with that continent.

Winslow's travels took him to California, Idaho and Montana before he moved to New York City to become a writer, making his living as a movie theater manager and later a private investigator in Times Square – ‘before Mickey Mouse took it over’. He left to get a master's degree in military history and intended to go into the Foreign Service but instead joined a friend's photographic safari firm in Kenya. He led trips there as well as hiking expeditions in southwestern China, and later directed Shakespeare productions during summers in Oxford, England.

Career
While traveling between Asia, Africa, Europe and America, Winslow wrote his first novel, A Cool Breeze On The Underground, which was nominated for an Edgar Award and a Shamus Award for Best First Novel. With a wife and young son, Winslow went back to investigative work, mostly in California, where he and his family lived in hotels for almost three years as he worked cases and became a trial consultant.

Winslow's second book, The Trail to Buddha’s Mirror, continued the Neal Carey saga. He followed that up with three more Neal Carey novels, Way Down on the High Lonely, for which he was a Dilys Award finalist, A Long Walk Up the Water Slide, and While Drowning in the Desert.

For his next novel, Winslow broke from the Neal Carey character to write the standalone Isle of Joy, about an ex-CIA agent who is pulled back into the world of espionage, this time as the target of his former agency and the FBI.

A film and publishing deal for his novel The Death and Life of Bobby Z, also a Barry Award finalist, for Best Novel, allowed Winslow to become a full-time writer and settle in his beloved California, the setting for many of his books.

Branching into television, Winslow, with his friend and agent Shane Salerno, co-created the NBC television series UC/Undercover. The series ran one season and aired 13 episodes.

Winslow then published the Shamus Award finalist California Fire and Life, and Looking for a Hero.

In 2005, Winslow published what would become the first book in his epic “Cartel Trilogy,” The Power of the Dog, about obsessive DEA Agent Art Keller's quest to take down an El Chapo-esque Sinaloan cartel. The book earned rave reviews around the world and was a finalist for the Barry, Macavity, Hammett, and Dilys awards.

Winslow then wrote The Winter of Frankie Machine, which garnered interest all over Hollywood and was eventually bought by Paramount Pictures for Robert De Niro to star in and Martin Scorsese to direct. During the development phase, screenwriter Eric Roth gave De Niro a book to read as research for the role. De Niro became so enthralled with that book – I Heard You Paint Houses – that he and Scorsese ended up adapting it into The Irishman. Winslow took it all in stride, even penning a humorous article on Deadline Hollywood jokingly titled “I Blame Eric Roth.”

Winslow followed Frankie Machine with the first of his two Boone Daniels books, Dawn Patrol. Winslow was yet again a finalist for the Barry and Dilys Awards.

In 2010, Winslow published Savages, which was voted a top-10 book of the year by The New York Times, Los Angeles Times, Entertainment Weekly, The Chicago Sun Times, and author Stephen King, and was a Barry, Dilys, and Steel Dagger Award finalist. The rights were quickly scooped up by award-winning filmmaker Oliver Stone. Winslow and Shane Salerno adapted the screenplay, and the film went on to star Aaron Taylor-Johnson, Taylor Kitsch, Blake Lively, Benicio del Toro, Salma Hayek, and John Travolta.  

After Savages, Winslow returned to the world of ultra-California cool cop-turned-PI Boone Daniels in The Gentlemen’s Hour. The book was a 2010 finalist for the Gold Dagger Award.

In 2011, Winslow wrote another standalone, Satori, a prequel to Trevanian’s 1979 novel Shibumi. Winslow again earned rave reviews from critics and colleagues alike. Satori was purchased by Warner Brothers and Leonardo DiCaprio’s Appian Way for DiCaprio to produce and star.

The following year, Winslow returned to the world of Savages, writing the prequel The Kings of Cool. Yet again, his book was a Gold Dagger finalist for Best Crime Novel of the Year.

2012 also saw Winslow given the prestigious Raymond Chandler Award, Italy's top lifetime achievement honor for masters of the thriller and noir literary genre. Past recipients have included Stephen King, John Le Carré, John Grisham, and Elmore Leonard.

In 2015, Winslow published the second book in his Cartel Trilogy, The Cartel. The book was an international success, earning starred reviews from Publishers Weekly, Booklist, and Library Journal, landing on Best Books of the Year lists for over sixty publications, including The New York Times, The Washington Post, The Seattle Times, Publishers Weekly, The Guardian, The Sunday Times, The Daily Mail, and many others. Fellow novelists Stephen King, Michael Connelly, James Ellroy, and Harlan Coben also raved about The Cartel, naming it one of Winslow's best. The book went on to win the Ian Fleming Steel Dagger Award, the RBA International Prize for Crime Writing, and Los Angeles Times Book Prize.

For his follow up the smash hit The Cartel, Winslow wrote another standalone, The Force, tackling corruption in the deepest recesses of the NYPD. The Force was another smashing success and named one of the Best Books of the Year by The New York Times, NPR, Barnes & Noble, Publishers Weekly, The Financial Times, The Daily Mail, Booklist, and LitHub. In a seven-figure deal, Fox purchased the film rights for James Mangold to direct Matt Damon in a script adapted by award-winning screenwriter Scott Frank.  

In 2019, Winslow published the third and final installment of his epic Cartel Trilogy, The Border. Critics raved about the conclusion to the sprawling saga and it was named one of the Best Books of the Year by The Washington Post, NPR, The Guardian, The Financial Times, The New York Post, The Dallas Morning News, The Irish Times, Booklist, and many others. The film rights to the trilogy had originally been purchased by 20th Century Fox but in 2019, due to the sprawling nature of the story and world therein, FX Networks acquired the rights from their sister studio to turn the novels into a TV series. Filming on the pilot is set to being in late-2022.

After concluding his Cartel Trilogy, Winslow published Broken, a collection of six short novellas all centered around the themes of crime, corruption, vengeance, justice, loss, and betrayal. Broken also earned starred reviews from Publishers Weekly and Kirkus Reviews.

Winslow's next novel, City on Fire, is the first book in a planned trilogy about the feuding Moretti and Murphy crime families in Providence, Rhode Island, in the 1980s and 1990s. The novel received critical acclaim and its screen rights were acquired by Sony to be adapted into a television series.

In addition to his novels, Winslow has published numerous short stories in anthologies and magazines such as Esquire, The Los Angeles Times Magazine and Playboy. His columns have appeared in the Vanity Fair, Vulture, Huffington Post, CNN Online, and other outlets.

In April 2022, Winslow announced his retirement from writing, in order to focus on his political video-making and activism. His City on Fire sequels will be his final books.

Political activism 
During the 2020 presidential election, Winslow became politically active online, using his own money to champion liberal causes and criticize Donald Trump and his agenda. Winslow and Shane Salerno began creating political videos critical of the Trump administration for social media. On October 13, 2020, Don Winslow Films released a video critical of Trump prior to his campaign event in Pennsylvania. The video features Bruce Springsteen's song "Streets of Philadelphia" and has been viewed almost 10 million times. As of January 4, 2021, Winslow's videos had garnered over 135 million views. As of April 2022, the total view count was over 250 million.

A libel lawsuit was filed against Winslow on the basis of comments Winslow made in 2020 about an Irwin County Detention Center contractor, who Winslow had claimed performed illegal hysterectomies purportedly done at the direction of Donald Trump. In 2022 a district court ruled that the libel claims could go forward.

Writing process
Winslow said he writes from 5:30 a.m. to 10 a.m. and then hikes six or seven miles before returning to work. He typically works on two books at a time, moving to the other when work on the first stalls. He said the longest he has gone without writing after a book is completed was five days. He has described writing as "an addiction".

The time it takes him to write a book varies. The Death and Life of Bobby Z was written on the train between Dana Point, California and Los Angeles, one chapter per trip. The Power of the Dog took six years to research and write, including a trip to Mexico to interview people with similar experiences as the book's characters.

Personal life
Winslow's career as an investigator often took him to California to look into arson cases, as his storytelling skills helped explain cases to juries. In the mid-1990s, he moved to California with his wife, Jean, and their infant son, Thomas, and continued writing. They currently split their time between Julian, California, and Rhode Island.

Works

Neal Carey series 
A Cool Breeze on the Underground (1991)
The Trail to Buddha's Mirror (1992)
Way Down on the High Lonely (1993)
A Long Walk Up the Water Slide (1994) 
While Drowning in the Desert (1996)

The Cartel series 
The Power of the Dog (2005)
The Cartel (2015)
The Border (2019)

Boone Daniels series 
The Dawn Patrol (2008)
The Gentlemen's Hour (2009)

Savages series 
Savages (2010)
The Kings of Cool (2012) (prequel to Savages)

Frank Decker series 
 2014: Missing. New York (2014; not published in English)
 2016: Germany (2016; not published in English)

City on Fire series 
 City on Fire (2022)
 City of Dreams (2023)
 City of Ashes (2024)

Standalone novels 
Isle of Joy (A Winter Spy under the pseudonym MacDonald Lloyd) (1996)
The Death and Life of Bobby Z (1997) 
California Fire and Life (1999)
The Winter of Frankie Machine (2006)
Satori (2011)
Vengeance (2014; not published in English)
The Force (2017)

Collections 
 2020:  Broken

Non-fiction 
 2004: Looking for a Hero (with Peter Maslowski),

Film, television, scripts and screenplays 
 UC: Undercover (TV series, co-creator)
 Full Ride (film, co-writer)
 Close to Home (2 episodes, writer)
 Savages (co-writer, based on his novel)
 Alexander Hamilton: In Worlds Unknown (script and film; New York Historical Society)

Adaptations 
 The Death and Life of Bobby Z (2007)
 Savages (2012, co-written by Winslow)
Upcoming adaptations
 The Force
 The Border
 City on Fire
 A Cool Breeze on the Underground

Awards
Winslow won the 2012 Raymond Chandler Award at the Courmayeur Noir Festival. Previous winners include John le Carré, John Grisham and Michael Connelly.

Awards by book:

A Cool Breeze on the Underground
 1992 Finalist for Edgar Best First
 1992 Finalist for Shamus Best First
 1994 Maltese Falcon Award, Japan

Way Down on the High Lonely
 1994 Finalist Dilys Award

The Death and Life of Bobby Z
 1998 Finalist Barry for Best Novel
 1998 Finalist Lefty Award

California Fire and Life
 2000 Shamus for Best Novel
 2000 Finalist Dilys Award

The Power of the Dog
 2005 Finalist Hammett Prize
 2006 Finalist Barry for Best Novel
 2006 Finalist Dilys Award
 2006 Finalist Macavity Award for Best Novel
 2009 Japan Adventure Fiction Association Prize
 2010 Maltese Falcon Award, Japan

The Winter of Frankie Machine
 2010 Japan Adventure Fiction Association Prize
 2011 Maltese Falcon Award, Japan

The Dawn Patrol
 2009 Finalist Barry for Best Novel
 2009 Finalist Dilys Award

The Gentlemen's Hour
 2010 Finalist Gold Dagger (Duncan Lawrie Dagger)

Savages
 2010 Finalist Dilys Award
 2011 Finalist Barry for Best Novel
 2011 Finalist Steel Dagger

The Kings of Cool
 2013 Finalist Gold Dagger (Duncan Lawrie Dagger)

The Cartel
2015 RBA Prize for Crime Writing (Spain), the world's most lucrative crime fiction prize at €125,000.
2016 Ian Fleming Steel Dagger given by CWA

References

External links
 Don Winslow's Website
 "When New-Wave Drug Dealers Run Afoul of an Old-Wave Cartel", Janet Maslin, The New York Times, 7 July 2010
 Don Winslow in Barcelona, speech and interview in Canal-L, channel of books and literature

1953 births
Living people
American mystery writers
Organized crime novelists
Maltese Falcon Award winners
Shamus Award winners
20th-century American novelists
21st-century American novelists
American male novelists
American male screenwriters
People from Julian, California
20th-century American male writers
21st-century American male writers